Nadia Aboulhosn is an American fashion blogger, model, and designer from Orlando, Florida. She is best known for designing clothing lines for Boohoo.com, Addition Elle, and Lord & Taylor. Aboulhosn has been featured in Vogue Italia, Complex Magazine, Refinery29, Seventeen Magazine, Teen Vogue, American Apparel, and BuzzFeed. She is of Lebanese descent. Originally from the big town of Btekhnay in Mount Lebanon.

Career 
At age 22, Nadia moved to Harlem, New York. She started her blog in 2010. Her blogging career began as something she did in her spare time and now she is a full-time fashion blogger. She also makes money by advertising and promoting clothing through modeling. Nadia advocates for the body positivity movement and self-acceptance. Her blog includes not only fashion but also features a humanitarian section. In August 2014, Nadia participated as a panelist for Create and Cultivate conference in Chicago for women entrepreneurs in the digital space. Some of her inspirations are Angelina Jolie and Oprah, and her favorite brands include Nasty Gal, ASOS, BooHoo, Missguided, and Adidas.

Her first modeling shoot was with Seventeen magazine for a curvy section. Shortly after she won American Apparel's model search.  After modeling in an Addition Elle lingerie campaign she was approached about designing. She created a Fall 2015 capsule collection, which was shown at New York Fashion Week. Her design featured a 14-piece collection for women sized 12–24 and described as “minimalistic”, “military” and “comfortable". Her line for Love & Legend was sold exclusively at Lord & Taylor. She was named the face of boohoo.com and took a partnership where she was also able to release her own collection which did really well.

In 2016 Abhoulson shot for the cover of Women's Running Magazine's April issue. Her message encourages hard-work and diversity, as well as reinventing the standards of the fashion industry. In January she did an interview with PAPER Magazine explaining how she is the model bridging the gap between straight and plus size.

References

External links
 

Living people
Female models from Florida
American women bloggers
American bloggers
American Druze
American people of Lebanese descent
1988 births
21st-century American women